Todd Selby is a photographer, illustrator, and author. His work represents neighborhoods like Brooklyn and Silver Lake.

The Selby 
Todd's photography is featured on his website TheSelby.com and often portrays the homes of prominent indie musicians, artists, designers, and actors. The purpose of The Selby is to capture interesting people in their creative spaces. He sells art, limited edition clothing, and jewelry on his site.  He has published three coffee-table books of his photography.

Bibliography 

 The Selby Is in Your Place , 2010. 
 Edible Selby, 2012. 
 Fashionable Selby, 2014.

External links 

 theselby.com
 GQ: Watch This: Behind the Scenes with Todd Selby

References 

Living people
American photographers
Year of birth missing (living people)